45th parallel may refer to:

45th parallel north, a circle of latitude in the Northern Hemisphere
45th parallel south, a circle of latitude in the Southern Hemisphere
 45th Parallel (organization), a nonprofit organization and chamber music ensemble based in Portland, Oregon
The 45th Parallel, a student-run newspaper at Taft High 7-12, a high school in Lincoln City, Oregon